Berwick railway station may refer to:

Berwick-upon-Tweed railway station, on the East Coast Main Line in Northumberland, UK
Berwick railway station (East Sussex), on the East Coastway Line in East Sussex, UK
Berwick railway station, Melbourne,  on the Pakenham line in Victoria, Australia

See also
North Berwick railway station, in East Lothian, Scotland, UK
Berwick station (disambiguation)
Berwick (disambiguation)